Govan is a town in Bamberg County, South Carolina, United States. The population was 65 at the 2010 census.

History
Govan is named for the Govan family of South Carolina.

Geography
Govan is located in western Bamberg County at  (33.2209, -81.1727). U.S. Route 321 passes through the town, leading north  to Denmark and south  to Fairfax.

Demographics

As of the census of 2000, there were 67 people, 30 households, and 21 families residing in the town. The population density was 88.8 people per square mile (34.5/km2). There were 37 housing units at an average density of 49.0 per square mile (19.0/km2). The racial makeup of the town was 71.64% White and 28.36% African American.

There were 30 households, out of which 20.0% had children under the age of 18 living with them, 56.7% were married couples living together, 13.3% had a female householder with no husband present, and 26.7% were non-families. 26.7% of all households were made up of individuals, and 13.3% had someone living alone who was 65 years of age or older. The average household size was 2.23 and the average family size was 2.68.

In the town, the population was spread out, with 14.9% under the age of 18, 6.0% from 18 to 24, 17.9% from 25 to 44, 37.3% from 45 to 64, and 23.9% who were 65 years of age or older. The median age was 49 years. For every 100 females, there were 81.1 males. For every 100 females age 18 and over, there were 90.0 males.

The median income for a household in the town was $20,313, and the median income for a family was $21,875. Males had a median income of $23,750 versus $25,625 for females. The per capita income for the town was $8,834. There were 28.6% of families and 23.9% of the population living below the poverty line, including no under eighteens and 46.7% of those over 64.

References

External links
Town information from Bamberg County website

Towns in Bamberg County, South Carolina
Towns in South Carolina